Mantis is a fictional character portrayed by Pom Klementieff in the Marvel Cinematic Universe (MCU) film franchise, based on the Marvel Comics character of the same name. She is a member of the Guardians of the Galaxy with empathic powers and is the paternal half-sister of its leader, Peter Quill. Introduced in Guardians of the Galaxy: Vol. 2 (2017), she is an alien ward of Ego with the power to control the emotions of people by touch. She is commonly depicted as having a naive and innocent personality.

, the character has appeared in four films: Guardians of the Galaxy Vol. 2, Avengers: Infinity War, Avengers: Endgame, and Thor: Love and Thunder, as well as The Guardians of the Galaxy Holiday Special. She will return in the upcoming film Guardians of the Galaxy Vol. 3.

Creation and characterization 

In May 2014, director James Gunn said that he had planned to introduce two major new characters in the Guardians of the Galaxy sequel, Mantis and Adam Warlock. Talks had begun with an actor Gunn had in mind to portray Mantis, while he had decided to remove Warlock due to the film "getting too busy". Gunn added that Warlock was "one character too many and I didn't want to lose Mantis and Mantis was more organically part of the movie anyway." Klementieff was cast in October 2015.

In Guardians of the Galaxy Vol. 2, Mantis is portrayed as a new member of the Guardians with empathic powers who lives with Ego.
 Executive producer Jonathan Schwartz said the character "has never really experienced social interaction", and learns about "social intricacies" from the other Guardians. Klementieff added, "She was really lonely and by herself, so it's a completely new thing to meet these people and to discover new things", comparing this to a child making awkward mistakes in social situations. Mantis and Drax have an "interesting" relationship in the film due to both being "complete odd balls". Steve Englehart, Mantis' co-creator, was disappointed with the character's portrayal, saying, "That character has nothing to do with Mantis ... I really don't know why you would take a character who is as distinctive as Mantis is and do a completely different character and still call her Mantis."

Dave Bautista indicated that at one point Gunn wanted to do "a Drax and Mantis film" as a spinoff, but that the concept was not pursued by Marvel. In September 2021, Gunn noted that for both Klementieff's Mantis and Karen Gillan's Nebula "their roles are both pretty huge" in the script for Guardians of the Galaxy Vol. 3. Mantis and Drax also play a major role in The Guardians of the Galaxy Holiday Special, of which Klementieff said, "I get to be the weirdest I've ever been as Mantis". Mantis also had a fight scene in the special, which revealed that she had superhuman strength and fighting abilities not previously portrayed in the MCU.

Fictional character biography

Joining the Guardians 
Mantis is raised by the living planet Ego (later revealed to also be her father) as a pet, due to her ability to use her powers to help him rest. Mantis and Ego's human-form projection later encounter the Guardians of the Galaxy—Peter Quill, Gamora, Drax, Rocket, Groot, and Nebula—after the Guardians traveled to a nearby planet to escape the Sovereign, from whom Rocket had stolen Anulax batteries during a battle. Ego's projection reveals that Ego is Quill's father, and they travel to the planet, Ego. Along the way, Mantis demonstrates her ability to detect people's emotions and feelings by touch. When Quill, Gamora, and Drax reach Ego, Mantis struggles with whether to tell Drax about Ego's evil plans, and ultimately joins the Guardians in their fight against Ego.

Infinity War and resurrection 

In 2018, Mantis is among the Guardians when they rescue Thor adrift in space. She accompanies Quill, Gamora, and Drax to Knowhere to fight Thanos, but is neutralized by Thanos using the Reality Stone, enabling Thanos to take Gamora. Mantis then goes to Titan with Quill and Drax, where they team up with Stephen Strange, Tony Stark, and Peter Parker in another attempt to wrest the Infinity Stones from Thanos. Although Mantis is able to temporarily control Thanos, he breaks free of her control when he is struck by an angered Peter Quill. Mantis is one of many characters who are killed as a result of The Blip.

After the Avengers reverse the Blip five years later, Mantis joins them in a battle against the army of Thanos, using her powers to subdue some of the attackers. Later, Mantis and the other members of the Guardians of the Galaxy attend the funeral of Tony Stark, who had sacrificed his life to stop Thanos.

New adventures

Mantis and the rest of the Guardians, accompanied by Thor, then return to space, where they eventually come to respond to various distress calls brought about by the killing of the gods of various worlds.

Later, after Thor goes his own way, the Guardians buy Knowhere from the Collector, and Mantis helps to refurbish it. When Quill is feeling depressed over the loss of his relationship with Gamora, Mantis joins the Guardians in attempting to give him a meaningful Christmas by helping Drax kidnap a fictionalized in-universe version of actor Kevin Bacon as a gift for Quill. Drax and Mantis land in Hollywood, Los Angeles, inadvertently make money as buskers posing for pictures on the Hollywood Walk of Fame, and get drunk at a bar. A seller of star maps offers to tell them where to find Kevin Bacon's house, and Mantis uses her powers to take the map without paying and to take all the seller's money. Later, Mantis reveals to Quill that Ego was also her father, making them half-siblings, which Quill says is the greatest Christmas gift ever.

Alternate versions 

In an alternate 2011, Mantis was among the numerous alien attendees of Thor's parties on Earth, until she and the attendees panicked when they were informed that Frigga was coming, and worked to clean up the mess on Earth.

Powers and abilities
Mantis has the power to sense the feelings and emotions of others whom she touches, and to influence their thoughts or cause them to fall asleep. In Guardians of the Galaxy Vol. 2 she was introduced as being powerful enough to put the self-described celestial Ego the Living Planet to sleep and was also shown to have superhuman durability, as she easily survived a huge fall landing on her feet and later just got knocked out when a flaming rock hit her in the head at full force. In Avengers: Infinity War, she was able to lull Thanos into a stupor, although she struggled to maintain this state.

Mantis is shown to have some fighting abilities and weapons training presumably taught to her since joining the Guardians.

In The Guardians of the Galaxy Holiday Special, she was able to instantly cause Kevin Bacon to cease resisting and voluntarily accompany herself and Drax to Knowhere, keeping him in that state for an extended period of time. She is also shown in the Holiday Special to have superhuman strength, agility, and fighting skills, as she fights and defeats multiple police officers at once, armed with only a giant holiday candy cane decoration, using a combination of martial arts and her ability to put people to sleep.

See also 
 Characters of the Marvel Cinematic Universe

References

External links 
 Mantis at the Marvel Cinematic Universe Wiki
 
 Mantis on Marvel.com

Avengers (film series)
Extraterrestrial superheroes
Female characters in film
Fictional characters displaced in time
Fictional characters from parallel universes
Fictional characters with energy-manipulation abilities
Fictional characters with superhuman durability or invulnerability
Fictional empaths
Fictional humanoids
Fictional mercenaries
Fictional outlaws
Fictional women soldiers and warriors
Film characters introduced in 2017
Guardians of the Galaxy characters
Guardians of the Galaxy (film series)
Marvel Cinematic Universe characters
Marvel Comics characters with superhuman strength
Marvel Comics characters who have mental powers
Marvel Comics extraterrestrial superheroes
Marvel Comics hybrids
Marvel Comics female superheroes
Marvel Comics orphans
Orphan characters in film
Space pirates
Superhero film characters